The Influencing Machine: Brooke Gladstone on the Media is a nonfiction graphic novel by journalist Brooke Gladstone and cartoonist Josh Neufeld. Gladstone describes the book as "a treatise on the relationship between us and the news media." It was further described by the New York Observer as "a manifesto on the role of the press in American history as told through a cartoon version of herself." The title of the book refers to On the Origin of the "Influencing Machine" in Schizophrenia, a 1919 article written by psychoanalyst Viktor Tausk.

Publication history 
The Influencing Machine was released in hardcover in May 2011. A paperback edition with a new cover was released in May 2012. A tenth anniversary edition, with a new cover, interior revisions, new material, and a new afterword, was released in January 2021.

Synopsis 
Much in the vein of Scott McCloud's Understanding Comics, Gladstone appears in the book as an illustrated character, taking the reader through two millennia of history — from the newspapers in Caesar's Rome to the penny press of the American Revolution and the activities of contemporary journalism. Issues discussed include bias, objectivity, misinformation, ethics, and a large chapter on war reporting. In a reference to the Trausk's "Influencing Machine," the book debunks the notion that “The Media” is an external force, outside of our control. Instead, it posits that the media is a mirror — sometimes a distorted one — reflecting society's beliefs and morals back at itself.

Reception 
The Influencing Machine received recognition from magazines, newspapers, and websites such as The New Yorker, National Public Radio, the Associated Press, The Nation, Columbia Journalism Review, and many others.

The book was named one of the best comics/graphic novels of 2011 by Publishers Weekly and the Library Journal. It was listed on a number of 2011 holiday gift guides, including New York magazine and BoingBoing. It was selected for 1book140, The Atlantic.com's reading club.

The Influencing Machine has been selected as a common read by a number of universities, including Alaska Pacific University, American University, Millersville University, the University of Alaska Anchorage,  and the University of Maryland.

Editions 
The Influencing Machine has been translated into Korean, Italian, French, and German.
 The Influencing Machine (English paperback edition) , W.W. Norton, May 2012
  Digesting the Media: Detailed History of Media; Eloquent Media Criticism (Korean edition), DoddleSaeghim, 2012
 Armi di Persuasione di Massa: Abbiamo i media che ci meritiamo (Italian edition) , Rizzoli Lizard, February 2013
 La Machine à Influencer: Une historie des medias (French edition)  Çà et Là, April 2014
 Der Beeinflussungsapparat (German edition) , Correctiv, April 2016
 The Influencing Machine (10th anniversary paperback edition) , W.W. Norton, January 2021

See also 
 On the Media

References

External links 
 The Influencing Machine page on the W. W. Norton website
 The Influencing Machine book trailer
 "Objectivity," a chapter from The Influencing Machine, hosted on Slate
 "The Goldilocks Number," a section from The Influencing Machine, hosted on Slate

2011 graphic novels
Non-fiction graphic novels
Educational comics
Criticism of journalism
Influence of mass media